The YouTube Original Channel Initiative was a $100 million program funded by Google to bring original content onto Google. The original channel initiative was also meant to kick start Google TV. The channels are collectively known as "original", "premium" or "YouTube funded" channels.

Participants include Madonna, Pharrell Williams, Young Hollywood founder R.J. Williams, former NBA star Shaquille O'Neal, comedian Amy Poehler, actor Ashton Kutcher, The Office star Rainn Wilson, comedian Kenny Hotz, Motor Trend, SourceFed, spiritual doctor Deepak Chopra and Modern Family actress Sofia Vergara. Most created channels through their production companies. Madonna is a partner with the dance channel DanceOn, while O'Neal plans the Comedy Shaq Network.

History

In September 2012, twenty of the 100 original channels started getting at least 1 million views a week.

In October 2012, it was announced that YouTube introduced 60 new original channels. Google invested $200 million into the original programming as well. The top 25 original programs also averaged around 1 million views per week at the time of the announcement.

In November 2012, YouTube ended funding for more than 60% of the 160 or so channels it financed as part of the initiative. After cancellation, YouTube kept all incoming revenue from these channels that failed to recoup their initial investments.

In November 2013, it was reported that the landing page for the original channels had become a redirect to a 404 error page, seemingly as a way for Google to remove any reference to the original channel initiative.

Content
The content of the YouTube Original Channel Initiative includes SourceFed, Young Hollywood, The Mom's View, The Wall Street Journal, Museum of Contemporary Art, Los Angeles, Crash Course, BadTeeth, i am OTHER, The Pet Collective, Epic Level TV, Geek & Sundry, MyMusic, Frederator Networks' Cartoon Hangover and The Multiverse among several others.

One of Tubefilter's articles includes a full list of the original channels, which differs from YouTube's listing.

Deadline Hollywood started tracking the weekly video view stats for all the channels part of YouTube's Original Channel Initiative in May 2012.

References

YouTube
YouTube-funded channels